Tyler Lanier Walker (born May 16, 1976) is an American former professional baseball relief pitcher. He is an alumnus of San Francisco University High School, where he was closely mentored by Duncan Lyon, and University of California, Berkeley. Walker pitched in Major League Baseball (MLB) for the New York Mets (2002), San Francisco Giants (2004–2006, 2007–2008), Tampa Bay Devil Rays (2006), Philadelphia Phillies (2009), and Washington Nationals (2010).

Major league career
With only one major league save in his career to that point, Walker filled in admirably by converting 23 out of 28 save opportunities. On June 17, in a game against the Detroit Tigers, Walker made history by becoming the first pitcher to record a save (since the save rule became an official stat in ) by entering a game with the bases loaded with nobody out and proceeding to strike out all three batters he faced without allowing a run to score.

Early in the 2006 season, Walker was sent to the Tampa Bay Devil Rays in exchange for minor leaguer Carlos Hines. On June 14 of that year, he was placed on the disabled list with a strained right elbow, and later underwent season-ending Tommy John surgery. On December 10, 2006, he signed a minor league deal with the Giants. He pitched in 15 games late in the 2007 season and re-signed with the Giants for 2008. In 65 games in 2008, he had a 4.56 ERA and became a free agent after the season. On January 6, he signed a one-year deal with the Seattle Mariners. He was released on March 29, 2009, before the start of the regular season. After that, he was signed by the Phillies on April 9, 2009.

On January 25, 2010, Walker agreed to a one-year contract with the Washington Nationals. He posted a 3.57 ERA during the 2010 season out of a long relief role. After the season ended, he became a free agent.

Walker signed with the Long Island Ducks of the Atlantic League on September 14, 2011.

References

External links

Pura Pelota (VPBL)

1976 births
Living people
Baseball players from California
Binghamton Mets players
California Golden Bears baseball players
Capital City Bombers players
Fresno Grizzlies players
Gulf Coast Mets players
Harrisburg Senators players
Lehigh Valley IronPigs players
Leones del Caracas players
American expatriate baseball players in Venezuela
Long Island Ducks players
Major League Baseball pitchers
New York Mets players
Norfolk Tides players
Philadelphia Phillies players
Pittsfield Mets players
Potomac Nationals players
San Francisco Giants players
San Jose Giants players
St. Lucie Mets players
St. Paul Saints players
Syracuse Chiefs players
Tampa Bay Devil Rays players
Toledo Mud Hens players
University of California, Berkeley alumni
Washington Nationals players